I, Ripper is a 2015 novel by the American author Stephen Hunter.

Plot
A fictional diary of serial killer Jack the Ripper interleaved with a narrative from a newspaper journalist, Jeb, reporting on the killings.

References

2015 American novels
American thriller novels
Novels about Jack the Ripper
Novels by Stephen Hunter
English-language novels
Fictional diaries
Simon & Schuster books